Niphogeton sprucei is a species of flowering plant in the family Apiaceae.
It is endemic to Ecuador.
Its natural habitat is subtropical or tropical high-altitude grassland.
It is threatened by habitat loss.

References

sprucei
Endemic flora of Ecuador
Critically endangered flora of South America
Taxonomy articles created by Polbot